Galveston is a 2018 American thriller film directed by Mélanie Laurent in her English-language directorial debut. It is written by Nic Pizzolatto (under the pseudonym Jim Hammett) and based on his novel of the same name. It follows a dying hitman (Ben Foster), who escapes a set up and heads to the titular town to plan his revenge, taking a young girl who was kidnapped by his boss (Elle Fanning).

The film had its world premiere at South by Southwest on March 10, 2018. It was released on October 19, 2018 by RLJE Films.

Plot
In 1988, New Orleans hitman Roy Cady is diagnosed with terminal lung cancer and storms out of his doctor's office. Roy is a heavy-drinking criminal enforcer and contract killer whose boss sets him up in a double-cross scheme. After killing his would-be assassins before they could kill him, Roy discovers Rocky, a young escort being held captive and reluctantly takes her with him on his escape. He returns to his hometown of Galveston, Texas where he plans his revenge after a sting is turned against him.

On the ride to his hometown, Rocky tells him she thought it was a legitimate business because she found it in the yellow pages and had no idea how it really was. They stop and get drunk at a bar, and Rocky offers sexual favors to Roy, but he rebuffs her. The next morning, Rocky asks Roy to stop because she says she can get money owed to her. Roy, sitting in the car hears a gunshot, and Rocky returns to the car with her three-year-old sister Tiffany. Rocky tells Roy that she fired a shot at the wall and didn't hurt anyone, but Roy later finds out that Rocky shot and killed her stepdad.

After Roy leaves for a few days and reconciles with an ex from the past he returns to find out Rocky's real story, and that she (thinking he left for good) is escorting again. He then finds out Tiffany, who she claimed was her sister, is really her daughter, by her stepdad in rape. Roy calls his old boss to blackmail him with incriminating documents found during the failed sting, demanding $75,000 to stay silent. Determined to find safety and sanctuary in Galveston, he tells Rocky that he will give her the money and convinces her to go to school and become something.

Just as Roy and Rocky finally start recognizing their feelings for one another on a date at a local bar, they are captured by a crew belonging to Roy's old boss. They are separated, and Roy is severely beaten. After a while, a woman from his past finds him and frees him, telling him to flee before someone finds him. He looks for Rocky to find her dead in another room from a brutal beating and gang rape. Roy escapes the compound, killing a bodyguard outside and taking his car and gun. He is emotionally distraught as he leaves and is involved in a car accident. He wakes in a hospital where a nurse tells him that he has aspergillosis, not cancer, and his condition is treatable by the state.

Roy is arrested on multiple charges and sent to jail. His former boss' lawyer meets with him and implies they know where Tiffany is and will kill her and the motel staff if he talks to the police. Because of his love for Rocky and Tiffany, he stays silent until he is released 20 years later. Tiffany, now an adult, shows up at his door as the town is preparing for Hurricane Ike. Roy says he will tell her the truth, but then he wants her to leave for her safety. He tells her that Rocky was actually her mother and she was not abandoned, giving her much needed closure. Roy is then seen walking toward the beach as he experiences flashbacks of Rocky.

Cast
 Ben Foster as Roy Cady
 Elle Fanning as Rocky
 Lili Reinhart as Tiffany
 Anniston and Tinsley Price as Young Tiffany
 Adepero Oduye as Loraine
 Robert Aramayo as Tray
 María Valverde as Carmen
 Beau Bridges as Stan Pitco
 CK McFarland as Nancy

Production
In November 2016, it was announced Elle Fanning and Ben Foster had joined the cast of the film, with Mélanie Laurent directing, from a screenplay written by Nic Pizzolatto who wrote the novel of the same name. Tyler Davidson, Jean Doumanian, Patrick Daly, Kevin Flanigan and Sean O’Brien will serve as producers and executive producers, respectively under their Low Spark Films and Jean Doumanian banners. In February 2017, Lili Reinhart, Beau Bridges, María Valverde and Robert Aramayo joined the cast of the film. Marc Chouarain composed the film's score.

Pizzolatto is credited under the pseudonym Jim Hammett, following Laurent's contributions to the screenplay, despite not being formally engaged as a writer on the project, feeling the final script did not reflect his own.

Filming
Principal photography began in February 2017. Filming took place in Savannah, Georgia.

Release

The film had its world premiere at South by Southwest on March 10, 2018. Shortly after, RLJE Films acquired distribution rights to the film. It also screened at the Los Angeles Film Festival on September 23, 2018. It was released on October 19, 2018.

Critical reception
The site's critical consensus reads "Galvestons talented cast - and confident direction from Mélanie Laurent - help set this uneven crime drama apart from less distinguished genre entries". On Metacritic, the film has a score of 57 out of 100, based on reviews from 17 critics, indicating "mixed or average reviews".

Keith Watson of Slant Magazine gave the film 2 out of 4 stars, saying: "A pensive but plodding story of criminals on the run, Mélanie Laurent's Galveston is a moody, slow-burn drama that never quite catches fire." Peter Debruge of Variety called the film "tough, uncompromising, and hauntingly believable, just a little too slow and a lot too serious for today's typical action audiences." Matt Zoller Seitz of RogerEbert.com wrote, "despite its limitations, this is a consistently engrossing, sometimes powerful crime drama that feels rich despite its brief running time." Mike D'Angelo of The A.V. Club gave the film a "B−" grade, stating that "it confirms Laurent as a significant talent behind the lens, particularly adept at building queasy tension."

References

External links
 

2018 films
American thriller films
American independent films
Films directed by Mélanie Laurent
Films with screenplays by Nic Pizzolatto
2018 thriller films
2018 independent films
2010s English-language films
2010s American films